Hindu College, Moradabad is situated in the heart of the city on Station Road. The college, 0.5 km from Moradabad Railway Station and 0.8 km from the bus station, is run by the Hindu Educational Society which comprises philanthropic and enthusiastic citizens of the town.

History

Hindu College was established in 1911 as a middle school. In 1916 it was upgraded in a high school and in 1937 it was converted into an intermediate college. In 1949 and 1950 it was recognized as Degree and Post Graduate College, respectively. Until 1960 B.Sc., M.Sc. (Maths), Commerce and B.Ed. classes were functioning, after that in 1961 courses of Art Faculty was established at the undergraduate level. In the succeeding years these courses were started at the post graduate level:

 1963 Chemistry
 1965 Physics and English
 1966 Zoology
 1969 Hindi and Economics
 1971 Sociology
 1972 Geography and Botany
 1977 Education (M.Ed.) and Political Science
 1983 Psychology
 1984 Sanskrit
 2006 Urdu and Defense studies

Hindu College was first affiliated to Agra University and later to with the establishment of Rohilkhand University — presently known as Mahatma Jyotiba Phule Rohilkhand University — in 1973.

Academics 

Courses in the Arts and Sciences are offered by the college in accordance with the syllabus and prescriptions of the Mahatma Jyotoba Phule Rohilkhand University. Every student is required to work towards a degree with a specific choice of subjects. The duration of M.A./M.Sc. programmes (post graduate) is two years; that of B.A., B.Sc. and B.Com. is three years.

 Department of Commerce
 Department of Mathematics
 Department of Physics
 Department of Chemistry
 Department of Zoology
 Department of Botany
 Department of Statistics
 Department of Economics
 Department of Political Science
 Department of Sociology
 Department of Psychology
 Department of History
 Department of Geography
 Department of Commerce
 Department of Defense Studies
 Department of Education
 Department of Hindi
 Department of English
 Department of Sanskrit
 Department of Urdu
 Department of Physical Education
 Department of Biotechnology

Academic achievements 

Almost all the faculty members hold PhDs. For smooth running of education programmes the college has upgraded library and developed infrastructure.

More than 30 seminars, conferences have been organized by departments of the college. Many research papers have been published by teachers in national and international journals.

Faculty members have received many minor and major research projects from funding agencies viz., UGC, CSIR, DST, etc.

Alumni are presently occupying high positions in India and abroad.

The Hindu College stands for distinction and excellence among all the colleges affiliated to Mahatama Jyotiba Phule Rohilkhand University, Bareilly. It has given good examination result every year with a pass percentage of above 80% out of which 45% were placed in first division, 50% in second division and 5% got third division.

Library 

The college library is very rich and contains more than 100,000 books regarding the following:
 Social Sciences: History, Political Science, Economics, Commerce and Sociology, Psychology, Geography, Defense Studies
 Sciences: Physics, Chemistry, Botany, Zoology, Mathematics
 Humanities: Hindi, English, Sanskrit and Urdu

In addition to those subjects, the library has a special collection of books on Art, Literature, General Knowledge and Sports. Besides books, the library regularly subscribes to a large number of daily newspapers, a wide variety of popular magazines and research journals.

See also
 Mahatma Gandhi Memorial Post Graduate College
 Government Degree College Sambhal

References

External links
 Official Site
 http://www.slideboom.com/people/rkpillai
 https://sites.google.com/site/hinducollegeorg/
 https://web.archive.org/web/20120322191028/http://connect.in.com/zoology/photos-1-1-1-a07f1af06e59aea1f800db77d5b8d470.html

Universities and colleges in Uttar Pradesh
Education in Moradabad
1949 establishments in India
Educational institutions established in 1949
Hindu universities and colleges